This is a list of Can I Pet Your Dog? episodes produced and distributed by Maximum Fun and hosted by Allegra Ringo, Renee Colvert, current producer Alexis B. Preston, and former producer Travis McElroy.

List of episodes

2015

2016

2017

2018

2019

2020

2021

2022

Bonus/Special episodes

References 

Lists of radio series episodes
Maximum Fun